Expedition 60 was the 60th Expedition to the International Space Station, which began on 24 June 2019 with the undocking of the Soyuz MS-11 spacecraft. The expedition was commanded by Aleksey Ovchinin, who transferred from Expedition 59 together with American flight engineers Nick Hague and Christina Koch. They were joined by Aleksandr Skvortsov, Luca Parmitano and Andrew Morgan, who arrived on Soyuz MS-13 on 20 July 2019. The expedition ended on 3 October 2019, when Soyuz MS-12 (carrying Ovchinin, Hague, and spaceflight participant Hazza Al Mansouri) undocked from the station and Koch, Skvortsov, Parmitano and Morgan transferred to Expedition 61.

During this expedition' final days, the station residents totaled 9 individuals temporarily upon the arrival of Soyuz MS-15, where for the first time since the departure of Soyuz TMA-16M in September 2015 the ISS crew exceeded the standard six.

Crew

Notes

References

Expeditions to the International Space Station
2019 in spaceflight